Bramley and Stanningley is an electoral ward of Leeds City Council in west Leeds, West Yorkshire, covering the former industrial area of Bramley and district of Stanningley.

Councillors since 1980 

 indicates seat up for re-election.
 indicates seat up for election following resignation or death of sitting councillor.
* indicates incumbent councillor.

Elections since 2010

May 2022

May 2021

May 2019

May 2018

May 2016

May 2015

May 2014

May 2012

May 2011

May 2010

Notes

References

Wards of Leeds